Qamar Zia (born 15 January 1954) is a former field hockey goalkeeper from Pakistan Men's National Hockey Team. He won the bronze medal in 1976 Summer Olympics in Montreal, Quebec, Canada.  He also won 1994 Men's Hockey World Cup with Pakistan. He Belongs to Arain family of Sahiwal.

References

External links
 
 Olympics official website

Living people
Pakistani male field hockey players
Olympic field hockey players of Pakistan
Olympic bronze medalists for Pakistan
Olympic medalists in field hockey
Medalists at the 1976 Summer Olympics
Field hockey players at the 1976 Summer Olympics
Asian Games medalists in field hockey
Field hockey players at the 1978 Asian Games
Field hockey players at the 1982 Asian Games
Asian Games gold medalists for Pakistan
Medalists at the 1978 Asian Games
Medalists at the 1982 Asian Games
1954 births
20th-century Pakistani people